Friedrick Noltenius was a German fighter ace of World War I. He shot down eight enemy aircraft and four observation balloons in six weeks fighting for Jagdstaffel 27. During a transfer to Jagdstaffel 6, he shot down an enemy airplane and an observation balloon four days apart. Posted to Jagdstaffel 11, he won six more aerial combats. By war's end, Friedrich Noltenius was credited with 21 confirmed aerial victories, as well as six uncredited ones.

List of victories

This list is complete for entries, though obviously not for all details. Double break in list marks transition between jagdstaffeln. Information was abstracted from: Above the Lines: The Aces and Fighter Units of the German Air Service, Naval Air Service and Flanders Marine Corps, 1914–1918,  Norman Franks, Frank W. Bailey, Russell Guest Grub Street, 1993, ; Aces of Jagdgeschwader III, Greg VanWyngarden, Osprey Publishing, 2016, . Abbreviations from those sources were expanded for reader comprehension by editor creating this list.

References

Citations

Bibliography

 
 

Aerial victories of Noltenius, Friedrich
Noltenius, Friedrich